Tumbarumba is a town in New South Wales, Australia, about  southwest of the state capital, Sydney.  Tumbarumba is located on the periphery of the Riverina and South West Slopes regions at the western edge of the Snowy Mountains. The  showed the population of the town and surrounding area to be 1,862 people. Locals refer to the town as 'Tumba'.

To the south and east, the highest peak of the Snowy Mountains and mainland Australia—Mount Kosciuszko—can be seen.

History
The Aboriginal history of the region is contentious. According to the map developed by Tindale, the area that is now Tumbarumba lay at the boundary of the lands of the Wiradjuri and Walgalu peoples. Since the Wiradjuri word for the 'Walgalu' was Guramal, meaning 'hostile men', presumably there was little in common between these peoples, who spoke different languages. The Walgulu spoke the same Ngarigo language as the more easterly Ngarigo people of the Monaro region, and in more recent times these groups have been considered by some to be just one people, the Ngarigo, whose lands included Tumbarumba. There are different views on the origin on the word 'tumbarumba' and whether it derives from the Wirajuri or Ngarigo language. Tumbarumba and surrounds now lie within the Brungle/Tumut Aboriginal Land Council Area.

The settler community was established in the late 1850s after gold was discovered in the district. The Post Office opened on 1 August 1860 but was spelt Tumberumba until 1915.

A railway branch line was opened to Tumbarumba in 1921. The Tumbarumba railway line ran from Wagga Wagga through Tarcutta. The service ceased in September 1974 and the line has since been officially closed. The 21 km final section of the line between Rosewood and Tumbarumba opened as the first rail trail in NSW in April 2020.

Gold mining petered out in the 1930s, and the region's economy now depends on agriculture and tourism.  The timber industry dominates the Shire's economy.

The name Tumbarumba may be derived from the sound of thunder. or alternatively from the Aboriginal words for "hollow sounding ground", "thunder", "sound" or "place of big trees".

Industry
The major industry in the town is softwood timber processing, with the Hyne and Sons Timber Mill to the west of the town being the biggest employer. Other industries include tourism, viticulture (Tumbarumba is in the Tumbarumba wine region), and blueberry growing.  Tourism is a source of income due to its proximity to the snow fields.

Tourism
Tumbarumba provides a convenient base for visiting the Western Snowy Mountains area.

The town lies on the Snowy Valleys Way which Destination NSW advertises as a more leisurely and picturesque driving route to take between Sydney and Melbourne. The Snowy Valleys way links Gundagai and Beechworth passing through Tumut, Tumbarumba and Corryong.

Tumbarumba is also close to the 440 km Hume and Hovell Track. Access to the track is at the Henry Angel Trackhead, 9 km from Tumbarumba toward Khancoban. A half day walk from the Henry Angel Trackhead to 'Big Hill' provides views of the western face of the Snowy Mountains Main Range. This walk passes old gold workings at the Burra Falls.

Tumbarumba is also the centre of the Tumbarumba wine region, a developing cool climate wine growing region with the first plantings in 1982. Several local wineries have 'cellar doors' with wines for sale.

The Museum and Visitor Information Centre on Bridge Street is open 363 days of the year, and the Tumbarumba Library and Archive on Prince Street is open Monday to Saturday, but check for opening hours.

The Tumbarumba to Rosewood Rail Trail opened April 2020. The rail trail is a 21 km walking and cycling trail that follows the closed Tumbarumba branch line. The rail trail has boosted tourism to the region.

Education
There are three schools in Tumbarumba. Tumbarumba Public School and All Saints Primary School (Catholic) providing primary education. Tumbarumba High School provides secondary education to the district.

Events
The Tumbarumba Rodeo is held annually at the Tumbarumba Showground on New Years Day (1 January). In addition, Tumbafest, an annual weekend long music, wine and market festival, is held on the last weekend in February. Past festivals have attracted acts like Leo Sayer (in 2015). Tumbarumba Tastebuds is a festival celebrating local food, wine and art. It is held in the Spring.

Climate
Tumbarumba has a South West Slopes climate, with a great seasonal range of maximum temperatures and a pronounced winter rainfall peak. Frosts are frequent throughout much of the year. Snow is fairly common, although the town is located in a deep valley. The town gets 109.2 clear days annually, with the grand majority in summer and early autumn.

Rainfall records commenced at Tumbarumba Post Office in 1885, however temperature records (both averages and extremes) didn't commence until 1965.

Sport
The Tumbarumba Greens field rugby league teams in the Murray Cup competition. The club is notable for having a full team of Goldspinks playing in the 1960s. The club formerly competed in the Group 13 Rugby League and Group 9 Rugby League competitions before joining their current league.

The Tumbarumba Kangaroos compete in the Victorian-based Upper Murray Football League.

Cultural references
In November 1963, New Zealander Johnny Devlin (with Bee Gees on backing vocals) released the single "Stomp The Tumbarumba", a song covered later by, among others, the Australian rock band Hoodoo Gurus (see "Come Anytime" and "1000 Miles Away"). Tumbarumba in the song's title may or may not have something to do with the name of the town.
Tumbarumba is one of the very few Australian placenames mentioned in James Joyce's prose-poem Finnegans Wake. 'Tumbarumba mountain' is listed as one of the places of origin of HCE (Humphrey Chimpden Earwicker), one of the central characters of the Wake (FW 596.11).
 Shirley Abicair, the UK based Australian singer, made the town of Tumbarumba's name familiar to many British children with the publication of her book "Tales of Tumbarumba" in 1962.
Tumbarumba is another word for a tmesis, a linguistic term which refers to the placing of a word within another word, such as "ri-goddamn-diculous". The origin of this meaning may come from the poem "Tumba-bloody-rumba" by John O'Grady, which includes several tmeses including "Tumba-bloody-rumba", "e-bloody-nough", and "kanga-bloody-roos".

Gallery

See also

 Mannus Correctional Centre

References

External links

 Tumbarumba Shire Council
 Demographic profile of Tumbarumba Shire in 2001
 Discussion on Lost Poetry web site of authorship of the poem Tumba-bloody-rumba
 Tumbarumba Railway Station
 Tumbafest website
 Tumbarumba to Rosewood Rail Trail

Towns in New South Wales
Snowy Valleys Council
Tumbarumba, New South Wales
Mining towns in New South Wales